Belmont Cave is a white limestone dry cave in the Cockpit Country of Jamaica. It is also known as Drip Cave, being a single cave with two close entrances.

Natural history
Like many caves in Jamaica, Belmont is a major bat roost. The bat guano in turn supports a large invertebrate population of troglobite cockroaches (Nelipophygus), cave crickets, flies and cave spiders, as well as being home to the frog Eleutherodactylus cundalli.

See also
List of caves in Jamaica
Jamaican Caves Organisation

References

External links
Map
Aerial view.
Photos: Entrance  
Belmont Cave - Jamaican Caves Organisation

Bat roosts
Caves of Jamaica
Geography of Trelawny Parish
Caves of the Caribbean